The Hemingray Glass Company was an American glass manufacturing company founded by Robert Hemingray and Ralph Gray in Cincinnati in 1848. In its early years, the company went through numerous and frequent name changes, including Gray & Hemingray; Gray, Hemingray & Bros.; Gray, Hemingray & Brother; Hemingray Bros. & Company; and R. Hemingray & Company before incorporating into the Hemingray Glass Company, Inc. in 1870. The Hemingray Glass Company had factories in Cincinnati and Covington, Kentucky with main production in Muncie, Indiana. Although Hemingray was best known for its telegraph insulators, the company produced many other glass items including bottles, fruit jars, pressed glass dishes, tumblers, battery jars, fishbowls, lantern globes, and oil lamps. In 1933, the Owens-Illinois Glass Company purchased the company but retained the production facility in Muncie under the Hemingray name.

The main plant in Muncie closed in 1972 and insulator production ceased. The complex is now used by Gerdau Ameristeel, a steel production company headquartered in Brazil.

Insulators 
Hemingray was best known for producing telegraph and telephone pin insulators used on utility poles. To give an overview of the large variety of styles produced, the following table contains the twenty most common. The table provides two numbers: the Consolidated Design (CD) number and the style number. The CD number is from a classification system developed by collectors that refers to the shape of the insulator, and is independent of the Hemingray Glass Company. However, the style number (or name) was assigned by Hemingray to each insulator. Due to slight modifications in design over years of production, single styles can span multiple CD numbers.

See also 
 Brookfield Glass Company

References

External links 
 Hemingray.net online museum
 Hemingray Glass Company
 Hemingray.info: Pictures and descriptions of Hemingray insulators
 Dating Hemingray insulators
 Hemingray Glass Company - Summary

Glassmaking companies of the United States
Dielectrics
Defunct glassmaking companies
Defunct manufacturing companies based in Indiana
Manufacturing companies based in Ohio
Muncie, Indiana
Manufacturing companies established in 1848
Manufacturing companies disestablished in 1966
1848 establishments in Ohio
1966 disestablishments in Indiana